Ky Fan (樊𰋀, September 19, 1914 – March 22, 2010) was a Chinese-born American mathematician. He was a professor of mathematics at the University of California, Santa Barbara.

Biography
Fan was born in Hangzhou, the capital of Zhejiang Province, China. His father, named Fan Qi (樊琦, 1879—1947), served in the district courts of Jinhua and Wenzhou. Ky Fan went to Jinhua with his father when he was eight years old and studied at several middle schools in Zhejiang, including the Jinhua High School (currently Jinhua No.1 Middle School), Hangzhou Zongwen High School (currently Hangzhou No.10 Middle School), and Wenzhou High School. Fan obtained his secondary diploma from the Jinhua High School.

Fan enrolled into Peking University Department of Mathematics in 1932, and received his B.S. degree from Peking University in 1936. Initially Fan wanted to study engineering, but eventually shifted to mathematics, largely because of the influence of his uncle Feng Zuxun (冯祖荀, 1880–1940; b. Hangzhou, d. Beijing), who was a mathematician in China and the then Chair of the Department of Mathematics of Peking University. After graduation, Fan became a teaching assistant in the department.

Fan went to France in 1939 and received his D.Sc. degree from the University of Paris in 1941. Fan's doctoral advisor was M.R.Fréchet. Fan was a research fellow at the French National Centre for Scientific Research (CNRS). During his secondary school and college time, Fan said he "hated English". That was an important reason for him to choose mathematics, with less English but full of equations, and go to Paris.

Fan was a member of the Institute for Advanced Study in Princeton, New Jersey from 1945 to 1947. In 1947, Fan joined the mathematical faculty of the University of Notre Dame, where he was an assistant professor at the beginning, and later promoted to associate professor and full professor. In 1960, Fan also held a position at Wayne State University in Detroit for about one year, but immediately went to Northwestern University near Chicago. In 1965, Fan became a professor of mathematics at UCSB. Fan was known for being an extremely strict professor.

Fan was elected an Academician of the Academia Sinica (Taipei, Taiwan) in 1964. He served as the director of the Institute of Mathematics there from 1978 to 1984.

In 1999, Fan and his wife Yan Youfen (燕又芬) donated one million US dollars to the American Mathematical Society, to set up the Ky and Yu-Fen Fan Endowment.

Fan had 23 graduate students. He died in Santa Barbara in March 2010.

His given name 𰋀 is a rare variant of the character 畿.

Academic career
Fan was a student and collaborator of M. Fréchet and was also influenced by John von Neumann and Hermann Weyl. The author of approximately 130 papers, Fan made fundamental contributions to operator and matrix theory, convex analysis and  inequalities, linear and nonlinear programming, topology and fixed point theory, and topological groups. His work in fixed point theory, in addition to influencing nonlinear functional analysis, has found wide application in mathematical economics and game theory, potential theory, calculus of variations, and differential equations.

The following are named after him:
 Ky Fan norms 
 Ky Fan inequality
 Ky Fan inequality (game theory)
 Ky Fan lemma

Publications

Sur quelques notions fondamentales de l'analyse générale, 1941
Introduction à la topologie combinatoire, co-author with M.R.Fréchet, first published in 1946, later translated into English and Spanish.
Invitation to combinatorial topology, 2003
Fonctions définies-positives et les fonctions complètement monotones; leurs applications au calcul des probabilités et à la théorie des espaces distanciés, 1950

References

External links

Obituary of Ky Fan by Bor-Luh Lin in the Notices of the American Mathematical Society.
Tales of Dr. Fan by Dennis Wildfogel.

1914 births
2010 deaths
20th-century American mathematicians
Chinese emigrants to the United States
Educators from Hangzhou
Institute for Advanced Study visiting scholars
Mathematicians from Zhejiang
Members of Academia Sinica
Northwestern University faculty
National University of Peking alumni
Academic staff of Peking University
Scientists from Hangzhou
University of California, Santa Barbara faculty
University of Notre Dame faculty
University of Paris alumni
Wayne State University faculty
Chinese expatriates in France